The Robin Hood Inn, Nos. 124 and 126, Monnow Street, Monmouth, Monmouthshire, Wales, is a public house of late medieval origins. It was Grade II* listed in 1952.

History

The Robin Hood Inn building has late medieval origins. It is constructed in stone, with a wide, four-centre doorway dating to the fifteenth century, and is a rare medieval survival in Monmouth. After the Reformation, the town was a centre for Catholicism and the landlord in the 1770s, Michael Watkins, allowed Mass to be celebrated in an upper room of the pub. The Penal Laws against Catholics were in force until the Papists Act of 1778, and Watkins was amongst those who successfully petitioned Monmouth magistrates to allow a building that would become St Mary's Roman Catholic Church. This public house and the church that Michael Watkins lobbied for are two of the 24 buildings in the Monmouth Heritage Trail. A blue plaque was added to the exterior of the building in 2009, which celebrated the religious history of the building.

In 1848, one of the landlord's children accidentally set a curtain on fire by placing a candle too near it. The ensuing fire destroyed the curtain and a few items of clothing before it was contained. In 1882, the landlord, John Richards, was charged with being drunk and disorderly in his own house. He was found guilty and fined 10s and 7s costs. It was designated as a Grade II* listed building on 27 June 1952.

Notes

External links
 

History of Monmouthshire
Pubs in Monmouth
Grade II* listed buildings in Monmouthshire
Grade II* listed pubs in Wales